Franklin's lost expedition was a failed British voyage of Arctic exploration led by Captain Sir John Franklin that departed England in 1845 aboard two ships,  and , and was assigned to traverse the last unnavigated sections of the Northwest Passage in the Canadian Arctic and to record magnetic data to help determine whether a better understanding could aid navigation. The expedition met with disaster after both ships and their crews, a total of 129 officers and men, became icebound in Victoria Strait near King William Island in what is today the Canadian territory of Nunavut. After being icebound for more than a year Erebus and Terror were abandoned in April 1848, by which point Franklin and nearly two dozen others had died. The survivors, now led by Franklin's second-in-command, Francis Crozier, and Erebuss captain, James Fitzjames, set out for the Canadian mainland and disappeared, presumably having perished.

Pressed by Franklin's wife, Jane, and others, the Admiralty launched a search for the missing expedition in 1848. In the many subsequent searches in the decades afterwards, several artifacts from the expedition were discovered, including the remains of two men, which were returned to Britain. A series of scientific studies in modern times suggested that the men of the expedition did not all die quickly. Hypothermia, starvation, lead poisoning or zinc deficiency, and diseases including scurvy, along with general exposure to a hostile environment while lacking adequate clothing and nutrition, killed everyone on the expedition in the years after it was last sighted by Europeans in 1845. Cut marks on some of the bones recovered during these studies also supported allegations of cannibalism reported by Franklin searcher John Rae in 1854.

Despite the expedition's notorious failure, it did succeed in exploring the vicinity of what was one of the many Northwest Passages to eventually be discovered. Robert McClure led one of the expeditions that investigated the fate of Franklin's expedition, a voyage which was also beset by great challenges and later controversies. McClure's expedition returned after finding an ice-bound route that connected the Atlantic Ocean to the Pacific Ocean. The Northwest Passage was not navigated by boat until 1906, when Roald Amundsen traversed the passage on the Gjøa.

In 2014 a Canadian search team led by Parks Canada located the wreck of Erebus in the eastern portion of Queen Maud Gulf. Two years later, the Arctic Research Foundation found the wreck of Terror south of King William Island, in the body of water named Terror Bay. Research and dive expeditions are an annual occurrence at the wreck sites, now protected as a combined National Historic Site.

Background
The search by Europeans for a western shortcut by sea from Europe to Asia began with the voyages of Portuguese and Spanish explorers such as Bartolomeu Dias, Vasco da Gama and even Christopher Columbus (a Genoese explorer at the service of the King of Spain) in the 15th century. By the mid-19th century numerous exploratory expeditions had been mounted, originating mainly from the Kingdom of England (a part of the Kingdom of Great Britain from 1707, a part of the United Kingdom from 1801). These voyages, when successful, added to the sum of European geographic knowledge about the Western Hemisphere, particularly North America. As that knowledge grew, exploration gradually shifted towards the Arctic.

Sixteenth- and seventeenth-century voyagers who made geographic discoveries about North America included Martin Frobisher, John Davis, Henry Hudson and William Baffin. In 1670 the incorporation of the Hudson's Bay Company led to further exploration of the Canadian coastlines, interior and adjacent Arctic seas. In the 18th century explorers of this region included James Knight, Christopher Middleton, Samuel Hearne, James Cook, Alexander MacKenzie and George Vancouver. By 1800 their discoveries had conclusively demonstrated that no Northwest Passage between the Pacific and Atlantic Oceans existed in the temperate latitudes.

In 1804 Sir John Barrow became Second Secretary of the Admiralty, a post he held until 1845. Barrow began pushing for the Royal Navy to find a Northwest Passage over the top of Canada and to navigate toward the North Pole, organizing a major series of expeditions. Over those four decades explorers including John Ross, David Buchan, William Edward Parry, Frederick William Beechey, James Clark Ross (nephew of John Ross), George Back, Peter Warren Dease and Thomas Simpson led productive expeditions to the Canadian Arctic. Among those explorers was John Franklin, who first travelled to the region in 1818 as second-in-command of an expedition towards the North Pole in the ships Dorothea and Trent. Franklin was subsequently leader of two overland expeditions to and along the Canadian Arctic coast, in 1819–22 and 1825–27.

It was into this unexplored area that the next expedition was to sail, heading west through Lancaster Sound, then west and south – however ice, land and other obstacles might allow – with the goal of finding a Northwest Passage.

Preparations

Command
Barrow was now 82 years old and nearing the end of his career. He felt that the expeditions were close to finding a Northwest Passage, perhaps through what Barrow believed to be an ice-free Open Polar Sea around the North Pole. Barrow deliberated over who should command the next expedition. Parry, his first choice, was tired of the Arctic and politely declined. His second choice, James Clark Ross, also declined because he had promised his new wife that he had finished polar exploration. Barrow's third choice, James Fitzjames, was rejected by the Admiralty for his youth. Barrow considered Back but thought he was too argumentative. Francis Crozier, another possibility, was of humble birth and Irish, which counted against him. Reluctantly, Barrow settled on the 59-year-old Franklin.

Franklin was given command of Erebus; Crozier was appointed his executive officer and was again made commander of Terror. Fitzjames was appointed second-in-command of Erebus. Franklin received command of the expedition on 7 February 1845, and his official instructions on 5 May 1845.

Ships, provisions and personnel

Erebus (378 tons bm) and Terror (331 tons bm) were sturdily built and well equipped, including several recent inventions. Steam engines were fitted, driving a single screw propeller in each vessel; these engines were converted former locomotives from the London & Croydon Railway. The ships could make  on steam power, or travel under wind power to reach higher speeds and/or save fuel.

Other advanced technology in the ships included reinforced bows constructed of heavy beams and iron plates, an internal steam heating system for the comfort of the crew in polar conditions, and a system of iron wells that allowed the screw propellers and iron rudders to be withdrawn into the hull to protect them from damage. The ships also carried libraries of more than 1,000 books and three years' supply of food, which included tinned soup and vegetables, salt-cured meat, pemmican and several live cattle. The tinned food was supplied from a provisioner, Stephen Goldner, who was awarded the contract on 1 April 1845, a mere seven weeks before Franklin set sail. Goldner worked frantically on the large order of 8,000 tins. The haste required affected quality control of some of the tins, which were later found to have  that was "thick and sloppily done, and dripped like melted candle wax down the inside surface".

Most of the crew were English, many from Northern England, with smaller numbers of Irish, Welsh and Scottish members. Two of the sailors were not born in the British Isles: Charles Johnson was from Halifax, Nova Scotia, Canada and Henry Lloyd was from Kristiansand, Norway. The only officers with prior experience of the Arctic were Franklin, Crozier, Erebus First Lieutenant Graham Gore, Terror assistant surgeon Alexander McDonald and the two ice-masters, James Reid (Erebus) and Thomas Blanky (Terror).

Australian connections
Franklin had been Lieutenant-Governor of Van Diemen's Land (now Tasmania, Australia) from 1837 to 1843. The crew included two members with close family connections to explorers of Australia who later died on expedition. Commander Henry Le Vesconte was the first cousin of William John Wills, the co-leader of the 1861 Burke and Wills expedition, the first European to cross the Australian mainland from south to north; both Burke and Wills perished on the return journey. William Gibson, a steward on Terror, was the elder brother of Alfred Gibson, who disappeared on an 1874 expedition led by Ernest Giles to cross the deserts of Western Australia from east to west, and was honoured in the naming of the Gibson Desert. Giles recorded the connection in his journal entry of 21 April 1873:
I remarked to Gibson as we rode along that this was the anniversary of Burke's and Wills's return to their depot at Coopers' Creek and then recited to him, as he did not appear to know anything whatever about it, the hardships they endured, their desperate struggles for existence and death there; and casually remarked that Mr Wills had a brother [sic] who also lost his life in the field of discovery, as he went out with Sir John Franklin in 1845. Gibson then remarked, "Oh, I had a brother who died with Franklin at the North Pole and my father had a great deal of trouble getting his pay from Government".

Outward journey and loss

The expedition set sail from Greenhithe, Kent, on the morning of 19 May 1845, with a crew of 24 officers and 110 men. The ships stopped briefly in Stromness, Orkney Islands, in northern Scotland.

At the Whalefish Islands in Disko Bay, on the west coast of Greenland, 10 oxen carried on Barretto Junior were slaughtered for fresh meat which was transferred to Erebus and Terror. Crew members then wrote their last letters home, which recorded that Franklin had banned swearing and drunkenness. Five men were discharged due to sickness and sent home on Rattler and Barretto Junior, reducing the final crew to 129 men. In late July 1845 the whalers Prince of Wales (Captain Dannett) and Enterprise (Captain Robert Martin) encountered Terror and Erebus in Baffin Bay, where they were waiting for good conditions to cross to Lancaster Sound. The expedition was never heard of again by Europeans.

Only limited information is available for subsequent events, pieced together over the next 150 years by other expeditions, explorers, scientists and interviews with Inuit. The only first-hand information on expedition's progress is the two-part Victory Point Note  found in the aftermath on King William Island. Franklin's men spent the winter of 1845–46 on Beechey Island, where three crew members died and were buried. After travelling down Peel Sound through the summer of 1846, Terror and Erebus became trapped in ice off King William Island in September 1846 and are thought never to have sailed again.  According to the second part of the Victory Point Note dated 25 April 1848 and signed by Fitzjames and Crozier, the crew had wintered off King William Island in 1846–47 and 1847–48 and Franklin had died on 11 June 1847. The remaining crew had abandoned the ships and planned to walk over the island and across the sea ice towards the Back River on the Canadian mainland, beginning on 26 April 1848. In addition to Franklin, eight further officers and 15 men had also died by this point. The Victory Point Note is the last known communication of the expedition.

From archeological finds it is believed that all of the remaining crew died on the subsequent 400 km long march to Back River, most on the island. Thirty or 40 men reached the northern coast of the mainland before dying, still hundreds of miles from the nearest outpost of Western civilization.

The Victory Point note

The Victory Point Note was found eleven years later in May 1859 by William Hobson (lieutenant on the McClintock Arctic expedition) placed in a cairn on the north-western coast of King William Island. It consists of two parts written on a pre-printed Admiralty form. The first part was written after the first overwintering in 1847 and the second part was added one year later. From the second part it can be inferred that the document was first deposited in a different cairn previously erected by James Clark Ross in 1830 during John Ross's Second Arctic expedition – at a location Ross named Victory Point. The document is therefore referred to as Victory Point Note.

The first message is written in the body of the form and dates from 28 May 1847.

The second and final part is written largely on the margins of the form owing to lack of remaining space on the document. It was presumably written on 25 April 1848.

In 1859 Hobson found a second document using the same Admiralty form containing an almost identical duplicate of the first message from 1847 in a cairn a few miles southwest at Gore Point. This document did not contain the second message. From the handwriting it is assumed that all messages were written by Commander James Fitzjames. As he did not take part in the landing party that deposited the notes originally in 1847, it is inferred that both documents were originally filled in by Fitzjames on board the ships, with Lieutenant Graham Gore and Mate Charles Frederick Des Voeux adding their signatures as members of the landing party. This is further supported by the fact that both documents contain the same factual errors  namely the wrong date of the wintering on Beechey Island. In 1848, after the abandonment of the ships and subsequent recovery of the document from the Victory Point cairn, Fitzjames added the second message signed by him and Crozier and deposited the note in the cairn found by Hobson eleven years later.

19th century expeditions

Early searches

After two years had passed with no word from Franklin public concern grew and Jane, Lady Franklin, as well as members of Parliament and British newspapers, urged the Admiralty to send a search party. Although the Admiralty said it did not feel any reason to be alarmed it responded by developing a three-pronged plan, which in the spring of 1848 sent an overland rescue party, led by John Richardson and John Rae, down the Mackenzie River to the Canadian Arctic coast.

Two expeditions by sea were also launched, one, led by James Clark Ross, entering the Canadian Arctic archipelago through Lancaster Sound and the other, commanded by Henry Kellett, entering from the Pacific. In addition the Admiralty offered a reward of £20,000 (£ as of ) "to any Party or Parties, of any country, who shall render assistance to the crews of the Discovery Ships under the command of Sir John Franklin". When the three-pronged effort failed, British national concern and interest in the Arctic increased until "finding Franklin became nothing less than a crusade." Ballads such as "Lady Franklin's Lament", commemorating Lady Franklin's search for her lost husband, became popular.

Many joined the search. In 1850, 11 British and two American ships cruised the Canadian Arctic, including Breadalbane and her sister ship . Several converged off the east coast of Beechey Island, where the first relics of the expedition were found, including remnants of a winter camp from 1845 to 1846. Robert Goodsir, surgeon on the brig Lady Franklin, found the graves of John Torrington, John Hartnell, and William Braine. No messages from the Franklin expedition were found at this site.

In the spring of 1851, passengers and crew aboard several ships observed a huge iceberg off Newfoundland, which bore two vessels, one upright and one on its beam ends. The ships were not examined closely. It was suggested at the time that the ships could have been Erebus and Terror but it is now known that they were not; it is likely that they were abandoned whaling ships.

In 1852 Edward Belcher was given command of the government Arctic expedition in search of Franklin. It was unsuccessful; Belcher's inability to render himself popular with his subordinates was peculiarly unfortunate in an Arctic voyage and he was not wholly suited to command vessels among ice. Four of the five ships (Pioneer,  and Intrepid) were abandoned in pack ice, for which Belcher was court-martialled but acquitted.

One of those ships, HMS Resolute, was later recovered intact by an American whaler and returned to the United Kingdom. Timbers from the ship were later used to manufacture three desks, one of which, the Resolute desk, was presented by Queen Victoria to the US President, Rutherford B. Hayes; it has often been chosen by presidents for use in the Oval Office in the White House.

Overland searches

In 1854, Rae, while surveying the Boothia Peninsula for the Hudson's Bay Company (HBC), discovered further evidence of the expedition's fate. Rae met an Inuk near Pelly Bay (now Kugaaruk, Nunavut) on 21 April 1854, who told him of a party of 35 to 40 white men who had died of starvation near the mouth of the Back River. Other Inuit confirmed this story, which included reports of cannibalism among the dying sailors. The Inuit showed Rae many objects that were identified as having belonged to Franklin and his men.

In particular, Rae brought from the Inuit several silver forks and spoons later identified as belonging to Franklin, Fitzjames, Crozier, Fairholme and Robert Orme Sargent, a shipmate aboard Erebus. Rae's report was sent to the Admiralty, which in October 1854 urged the HBC to send an expedition down the Back River to search for other signs of Franklin and his men.

Next were Chief Factor James Anderson and HBC employee James Stewart, who travelled north by canoe to the mouth of the Back River. In July 1855, a band of Inuit told them of a group of qallunaat (Inuktitut for "whites", or "Europeans", perhaps best translated as "foreigners") who had starved to death along the coast. In August, Anderson and Stewart found a piece of wood inscribed with "Erebus" and another that said "Mr. Stanley" (surgeon aboard Erebus) on Montreal Island in Chantrey Inlet, where the Back River meets the sea.

Despite the findings of Rae and Anderson, the Admiralty did not plan another search of its own. Britain officially labelled the crew deceased in service on 31 March 1854. Lady Franklin, failing to convince the government to fund another search, personally commissioned one more expedition under Francis Leopold McClintock. The expedition ship, the steam schooner Fox, bought via public subscription, sailed from Aberdeen on 2 July 1857.

In April 1859, sled parties set out from Fox to search on King William Island. On 5 May, the party led by Lieutenant William Hobson found a document in a cairn left by Crozier and Fitzjames. It contained two messages. The first, dated 28 May 1847, said that Erebus and Terror had wintered in the ice off the northwest coast of King William Island and had wintered earlier at Beechey Island after circumnavigating Cornwallis Island. "Sir John Franklin commanding the Expedition. All well," the message said. The second message, written in the margins of that same sheet of paper, was much more ominous. Dated 25 April 1848, it reported that Erebus and Terror had been trapped in the ice for a year and a half and that the crew had abandoned the ships on 22 April. Twenty-four officers and crew had died, including Franklin on 11 June 1847, just two weeks after the date of the first note. Crozier was commanding the expedition, and the 105 survivors planned to start out the next day, heading south towards the Back River. This note contains significant errors; most notably, the date of the expedition's winter camp at Beechey Island is incorrectly given as 1846–47 rather than 1845–46.

The McClintock expedition also found a human skeleton on the southern coast of King William Island. Still clothed, it was searched, and some papers were found, including a seaman's certificate for Chief Petty Officer Harry Peglar, Captain of the Foretop, HMS Terror. However, since the uniform was that of a ship's steward, it is more likely that the body was that of Thomas Armitage, gun-room steward on Terror and a shipmate of Peglar, whose papers he carried.

At another site on the western extreme of the island, Hobson discovered a lifeboat containing two skeletons and relics from the Franklin expedition. In the boat was a large amount of abandoned equipment, including boots, silk handkerchiefs, scented soap, sponges, slippers, hair combs, and many books, among them a copy of The Vicar of Wakefield by Oliver Goldsmith. McClintock also took testimony from the Inuit about the expedition's disastrous end.

Two expeditions between 1860 and 1869 by Charles Francis Hall, who lived among the Inuit near Frobisher Bay on Baffin Island and later at Repulse Bay on the Canadian mainland, found camps, graves, and relics on the southern coast of King William Island, but he believed none of the Franklin expedition survivors would be found among the Inuit. In 1869, local Inuit took Hall to a shallow grave on King William Island containing well-preserved skeletal remains and fragments of clothing. These remains were taken to England and interred beneath the Franklin Memorial at Greenwich Old Royal Naval College, London.

The eminent biologist Thomas Henry Huxley examined the remains and it was concluded that they belonged to Henry Thomas Dundas Le Vesconte, second lieutenant on Erebus. An examination in 2009 suggested that these were actually the remains of Harry Goodsir, assistant surgeon on Erebus. Although Hall concluded that all of the Franklin crew were dead, he believed that the official expedition records would yet be found under a stone cairn. With the assistance of his guides Ipirvik and Taqulittuq, Hall gathered hundreds of pages of Inuit testimony.

Among these materials are accounts of visits to Franklin's ships, and an encounter with a party of white men on the southern coast of King William Island near Washington Bay. In the 1990s, this testimony was extensively researched by David C. Woodman, and was the basis of two books, Unravelling the Franklin Mystery (1992) and Strangers Among Us (1995), in which he reconstructs the final months of the expedition. Woodman's narrative challenged existing theories that the expedition's survivors all perished over the remainder of 1848 as they marched south from Victory Point, arguing instead that Inuit accounts point strongly to most of the 105 survivors cited by Crozier in his final note actually surviving past 1848, re-manning at least one of the ships and managing to sail it down along the coast of King William Island before it sank, with some crew members surviving as late as 1851.

The hope of finding other additional expedition records led Lieutenant Frederick Schwatka of the U.S. Army to organise an expedition to the island between 1878 and 1880. Travelling to Hudson Bay on the schooner Eothen, Schwatka, assembling a team that included Inuit who had assisted Hall, continued north by foot and dog sled, interviewing Inuit, visiting known or likely sites of Franklin expedition remains, and wintering on King William Island. However, Schwatka was successful in locating the remains of one of Franklin's men, identified by personal effects as John Irving, third lieutenant aboard Terror. Schwatka had Irving's remains returned to Scotland, where they were buried with full honours at Dean Cemetery in Edinburgh on 7 January 1881.

The Schwatka expedition found no remnants of the Franklin expedition south of a place now known as Starvation Cove on the Adelaide Peninsula.

Contemporary search expeditions
1848
 East: James Clark Ross, only to Somerset Island because of ice.
 Centre: Rae–Richardson Arctic expedition Mackenzie River and along the coast.
 West: HMS Plover, HMS Herald to Bering Strait; William Pullen reaches Mackenzie by whaleboat.
1850
 West: Richard Collinson (HMS Enterprise), Robert McClure (HMS Investigator) to Bering Strait. McClure frozen in at Banks Island and Investigator abandoned after two winters, crew trek east to Belcher expedition ships, becoming first Europeans to cross the northwest passage. Collinson reaches Coronation Gulf, furthest east of any ship.
 East: Horatio Austin, Erasmus Ommanney, plus 2 steam tenders, Pioneer and Intrepid (cpt John Bertie Cator 1850). Ommanney finds Franklin's Beechey Island camp. Austin's four and the below ships gather around Beechey Island, are frozen in and in spring send out sledge expeditions in all directions. They leave the Arctic before winter in 1851.
 East: Charles Forsyth (Prince Albert) financed by Lady Franklin; sledge on Somerset Island to Fury Beach.
 East: William Penny (Lady Franklin and Sophia)
 East: John Ross (schooner Felix)
 East: Edwin De Haven mounted the First Grinnell expedition.
1851
 William Kennedy (Prince Albert again) finds Bellot Strait proving that Somerset Island is an island.
1852
 Edward Augustus Inglefield in northern Baffin Bay.
 Edward Belcher in five ships: HMS Assistance (Belcher), HMS Resolute (Henry Kellett), Pioneer (Sherard Osborn), Intrepid (Francis Leopold McClintock) and depot ship  (William Pullen); much sledge exploration; rescues crew of HMS Investigator; all frozen in and abandoned except for North Star.
 Elisha Kane led the Second Grinnell expedition.
 Boat expedition up the Wellington Channel under the command of R. M'Cormick, R.N., in HMB Forlorn Hope.
1854
 John Rae learns where Franklin lost his ship.
1855
 Anderson and Stewart descend the Back River and find relics in Chantrey Inlet.
1857
 Francis McClintock finds relics at King William Island, including the sole surviving written records of the Franklin expedition (the Victory Point and Gore Point records), and a ship's boat on runners containing two corpses.
1869
 Charles Francis Hall at King William Island
1875
 Allen Young blocked at Peel Sound
1878
 Frederick Schwatka at King William Island

Modern expeditions

King William Island excavations (1981–1982)
In June 1981, Owen Beattie, a professor of anthropology at the University of Alberta, began the 1845–48 Franklin Expedition Forensic Anthropology Project (FEFAP) when he and his team of researchers and field assistants travelled from Edmonton to King William Island, traversing the island's western coast as Franklin's men did 132 years before. FEFAP hoped to find artefacts and skeletal remains in order to use modern forensics to establish identities and causes of death among the lost 129.

Although the trek found archaeological artifacts related to 19th-century Europeans and undisturbed disarticulated human remains, Beattie was disappointed that more remains were not found. Examining the bones of Franklin crewmen, he noted areas of pitting and scaling often found in cases of Vitamin C deficiency, the cause of scurvy. After returning to Edmonton, he compared notes from the survey with James Savelle, an Arctic archaeologist, and noticed skeletal patterns suggesting cannibalism. Seeking information about the Franklin crew's health and diet, he sent bone samples to the Alberta Soil and Feed Testing Laboratory for trace element analysis and assembled another team to visit King William Island. The analysis would find an unexpected level of 226 parts per million (ppm) of lead in the crewman's bones, which was 10 times higher than the control samples, taken from Inuit skeletons from the same geographic area, of 26–36 ppm.

In June 1982, a team made up of Beattie and three students (Walt Kowall, a graduate student in anthropology at the University of Alberta; Arne Carlson, an archaeology and geography student from Simon Fraser University in British Columbia; and Arsien Tungilik, an Inuk student and field assistant) was flown to the west coast of King William Island where they retraced some of the steps of McClintock in 1859 and Schwatka in 1878–79. Discoveries during this expedition included the remains of between six and fourteen men in the vicinity of McClintock's "boat place" and artifacts including a complete boot sole fitted with makeshift cleats for better traction.

Beechey Island excavations and exhumations (1984–1986)
After returning to Edmonton in 1982 and learning of the lead level findings from the 1981 expedition, Beattie struggled to find a cause. Possibilities included the lead solder used to seal the expedition's food tins, other food containers lined with lead foil, food colouring, tobacco products, pewter tableware, and lead-wicked candles. He came to suspect that the problems of lead poisoning compounded by the effects of scurvy could have been lethal for the Franklin crew. However, because skeletal lead might reflect lifetime exposure rather than exposure limited to the voyage, Beattie's theory could be tested only by forensic examination of preserved soft tissue as opposed to bone. Beattie decided to examine the graves of the buried crewmen on Beechey Island.

After obtaining legal permission, Beattie's team visited Beechey Island in August 1984 to perform autopsies on the three crewmen buried there. They started with the first crew member to die, Leading Stoker John Torrington. After completing Torrington's autopsy and exhuming and briefly examining the body of John Hartnell, the team, pressed for time and threatened by the weather, returned to Edmonton with tissue and bone samples. Trace element analysis of Torrington's bones and hair indicated that the crewman "would have suffered severe mental and physical problems caused by lead poisoning". Although the autopsy indicated that pneumonia had been the ultimate cause of the crewman's death, lead poisoning was cited as a contributing factor.

Beattie noted that the seams were poorly soldered with lead, which had likely come in direct contact with the food. The release of findings from the 1984 expedition and the photo of Torrington, a 138-year-old corpse well preserved by permafrost in the tundra, led to wide media coverage and renewed interest in the Franklin expedition.

Subsequent research has suggested that another potential source for the lead may have been the ships' distilled water systems rather than the tinned food. K. T. H. Farrer argued that "it is impossible to see how one could ingest from the canned food the amount of lead, 3.3 mg per day over eight months, required to raise the PbB to the level 80 μg/dL at which symptoms of lead poisoning begin to appear in adults and the suggestion that bone lead in adults could be 'swamped' by lead ingested from food over a period of a few months, or even three years, seems scarcely tenable." In addition, tinned food was in widespread use within the Royal Navy at that time and its use did not lead to any significant increase in lead poisoning elsewhere.

However, and uniquely for this expedition only, the ships were fitted with converted railway locomotive engines for auxiliary propulsion which required an estimated one tonne of fresh water per hour when steaming. It is highly probable that it was for this reason that the ships were fitted with a unique desalination system which, given the materials in use at the time, would have produced large quantities of water with a very high lead content. William Battersby has argued that this is a much more likely source for the high levels of lead observed in the remains of expedition members than the tinned food.

A further survey of the graves was undertaken in 1986. A camera crew filmed the procedure, shown in Nova'''s television documentary "Buried in Ice" in 1988. Under difficult field conditions, Derek Notman, a radiologist and medical doctor from the University of Minnesota, and radiology technician Larry Anderson took many X-rays of the crewmen prior to autopsy. Barbara Schweger, an Arctic clothing specialist, and Roger Amy, a pathologist, assisted in the investigation.

Beattie and his team had noticed that someone else had attempted to exhume Hartnell. In the effort, a pickaxe had damaged the wooden lid of his coffin, and the coffin plaque was missing. Research in Edmonton later showed that Sir Edward Belcher, commander of one of the Franklin rescue expeditions, had ordered the exhumation of Hartnell in October 1852, but was thwarted by the permafrost. A month later, Edward A. Inglefield, commander of another rescue expedition, succeeded with the exhumation and removed the coffin's plaque.

Unlike Hartnell's grave, the grave of Private William Braine was largely intact. When he was exhumed, the survey team saw signs that his burial had been hasty. His arms, body, and head had not been positioned carefully in the coffin, and one of his undershirts had been put on backwards. The coffin seemed too small for him; its lid had pressed down on his nose. A large copper plaque with his name and other personal data punched into it adorned his coffin lid.

NgLj-2 excavations (1992)
In 1992, Franklin scholar Barry Ranford and his colleague, Mike Yarascavitch, discovered human skeletal remains and artefacts of what they suspected to be some of the lost crewmen of the expedition. The site matches the physical description of McClintock's "boat place". In 1993, a team of archaeologists and forensic anthropologists returned to the site, which they referenced as "NgLj-2", on the western shores of King William Island in Erebus Bay, to excavate these remains. These excavations uncovered nearly 400 bones and bone fragments, and physical artefacts ranging from pieces of clay pipes to buttons and brass fittings. Examination of these bones by Anne Keenleyside, the expedition's forensic scientist, showed elevated levels of lead and many cut-marks "consistent with de-fleshing". On the basis of this expedition, it has become generally accepted that at least some groups of Franklin's men resorted to cannibalism in their final distress.

A study published in the International Journal of Osteoarchaeology in 2015 concluded that in addition to the de-fleshing of bones, thirty-five "bones had signs of breakage and 'pot polishing,' which occurs when the ends of bones heated in boiling water rub against the cooking pot they are placed in," which "typically occurs in the end stage of cannibalism, when starving people extract the marrow to eke out the last bit of calories and nutrition they can."

Wreck searches (1992–1993)
In 1992, Franklin author David C. Woodman, with the help of magnetometer expert Brad Nelson, organised "Project Ootjoolik" to search for the wreck reported by Inuit testimony to lie off the waters of Adelaide Peninsula. Over sixty strong magnetic targets were identified, of which five were deemed to have characteristics most congruent to those expected from Franklin's ships.

In 1993, Joe McInnis and Woodman organised an attempt to identify the priority targets from the year before. A chartered aircraft landed on the ice at three of the locations, a hole was drilled through the ice, and a small sector-scan sonar was used to image the sea bottom. However, due to ice conditions and uncertain navigation, it was not possible to exactly confirm the locations of the holes, and nothing was found although hitherto-unknown depths were found at the locations that were consistent with Inuit testimony of the wreck.

King William Island (1994–1995)
In 1994, Woodman organised and led a land search of the area from Collinson Inlet to (modern) Victory Point in search of the buried "vaults" spoken of in the testimony of the contemporary Inuit hunter Supunger. A ten person team spent ten days in the search, sponsored by the Royal Canadian Geographical Society, and filmed by the CBC Focus North. No trace of the vaults was found.

In 1995, an expedition was jointly organised by Woodman, George Hobson, and American adventurer Steven Trafton – with each party planning a separate search. Trafton's group travelled to the Clarence Islands to investigate Inuit stories of a "white man's cairn" there but found nothing. Hobson's party, accompanied by archaeologist Margaret Bertulli, investigated the "summer camp" found a few miles to the south of Cape Felix, where some minor Franklin relics were found. Woodman, with two companions, travelled south from Wall Bay to Victory Point and investigated all likely campsites along this coast, finding only some rusted cans at a previously unknown campsite near Cape Maria Louisa.

Wreck searches (1997–2013)
In 1997, a "Franklin 150" expedition was mounted by the Canadian film company Eco-Nova to use sonar to investigate more of the priority magnetic targets found in 1992. The senior archaeologist was Robert Grenier, assisted by Margaret Bertulli, and Woodman again acted as expedition historian and search coordinator. Operations were conducted from the Canadian Coast Guard icebreaker Laurier. Approximately  were surveyed, without result, near Kirkwall Island. When detached parties found Franklin relics – primarily copper sheeting and small items – on the beaches of islets to the north of O'Reilly Island the search was diverted to that area, but poor weather prevented significant survey work before the expedition ended. A documentary, Oceans of Mystery: Search for the Lost Fleet, was produced by Eco-Nova about this expedition.

Three expeditions were mounted by Woodman to continue the magnetometer mapping of the proposed wreck sites: a privately sponsored expedition in 2001, and the Irish-Canadian Franklin Search Expeditions of 2002 and 2004. These made use of sled-drawn magnetometers working on the sea ice and completed the unfinished survey of the northern (Kirkwall Island) search area in 2001, and the entire southern O'Reilly Island area in 2002 and 2004. All of the high-priority magnetic targets were identified by sonar through the ice as geological in origin. In 2002 and 2004, small Franklin artefacts and characteristic explorer tent sites were found on a small islet northeast of O'Reilly Island during shore searches.

In August 2008, a new search was announced, to be led by Robert Grenier, a senior archaeologist with Parks Canada. This search hoped to take advantage of the improved ice conditions, using side-scan sonar from a boat in open water. Grenier also hoped to draw from newly published Inuit testimony collected by oral historian Dorothy Harley Eber. Some of Eber's informants have placed the location of one of Franklin's ships in the vicinity of the Royal Geographical Society Island, an area not searched by previous expeditions. The search was to also include local Inuit historian Louie Kamookak, who has found other significant remains of the expedition and would represent the indigenous culture.

 became icebound in 1853 while searching for Franklin's expedition and was subsequently abandoned. It was found in shallow water in Mercy Bay on 25 July 2010, along the northern coast of Banks Island in Canada's western Arctic.

A new search was announced by Parks Canada in August 2013.

Victoria Strait Expedition: wreck of Erebus (2014)

On 1 September 2014, a larger search by a Canadian team under the banner of the "Victoria Strait Expedition" found two items on Hat Island in the Queen Maud Gulf near Nunavut's King William Island: a wooden object, possibly a plug for a deck hawse, the iron pipe through which the ship's chain cable would descend into the chain locker below; and part of a boat-launching davit bearing the stamps of two Royal Navy broad arrows.

On 9 September 2014, the expedition announced that on 7 September it had located one of Franklin's two ships. The ship is preserved in good condition, with side-scan sonar picking up even the deck planking. On 1 October at the House of Commons, Prime Minister Stephen Harper confirmed that the wreck is indeed HMS Erebus. A documentary, Hunt for the Arctic Ghost Ship, was produced by Lion Television for Channel 4's Secret History series in 2015.

In September 2018, Parks Canada announced that the Erebus has deteriorated significantly. "An upwards buoyant force acting on the decking combined with storm swell in relatively shallow water caused the displacement," according to a spokesperson. The underwater exploration in 2018 totalled only a day and a half due to weather and ice conditions and was to continue in 2019. Also in September 2018, a report provided specifics as to ownership of the ships and contents: the UK will own the first 65 artifacts brought up from HMS Erebus, while the wreck of both ships and other artifacts will be owned by Canada and the Inuit.

Arctic Research Foundation Expedition: wreck of Terror (2016)

In 2018, a team examined the wreck of HMS Terror using a remotely operated underwater vehicle (ROV) that collected photos and video clips of the ship and a number of artifacts. The group concluded that the Terror had not been left at anchor, since the anchor cables were seen to be secured along the bulwarks.

Scientific conclusions
Reasons for failure
The FEFAP field surveys, excavations and exhumations spanned more than 10 years. The results of this study from King William Island and Beechey Island artefacts and human remains showed that the Beechey Island crew had most probably died of pneumonia and perhaps tuberculosis, which was suggested by the evidence of Pott disease discovered in Braine. Toxicological reports pointed to lead poisoning as a likely contributing factor. Blade cut marks found on bones from some of the crew were seen as signs of cannibalism. Evidence suggested that a combination of cold, starvation and disease including scurvy, pneumonia and tuberculosis, all made worse by lead poisoning, killed everyone in the Franklin party.

More recent chemical re-examination of bone and nail samples taken from Hartnell and other crew members has cast doubt on the role of lead poisoning. A 2013 study determined that the levels of lead present in the crew members' bones had been consistent during their lives, and that there was no isotopic difference between lead concentrated within older and younger bone materials. Had the crew been poisoned by lead from the solder used to seal the canned food or from the ships' water supplies, both the concentration of lead and its isotopic composition would have been expected to have "spiked" during their last few months. This interpretation was supported by a 2016 study that suggested the crew's ill health may in fact have been due to malnutrition, and specifically zinc deficiency, probably due to a lack of meat in their diet. This study used micro-X-ray fluorescence to map the levels of lead, copper and zinc in Hartnell's thumbnail over the final months of his life, and found that apart from during his last few weeks lead concentrations within Hartnell's body were within healthy limits. In contrast, levels of zinc were far lower than normal and indicated that Hartnell would have been suffering from chronic zinc deficiency, sufficient to have severely suppressed his immune system and left him highly vulnerable to a worsening of the tuberculosis with which he was already infected. In the last few weeks of his life, his illness would have caused his body to start breaking down bone, fat and muscle tissues, releasing lead previously stored there into his bloodstream and giving rise to the high lead levels noted in previous analysis of soft tissues and hair.

Franklin's chosen passage down the west side of King William Island took Erebus and Terror into "a ploughing train of ice ... [that] does not always clear during the short summers", whereas the route along the island's east coast regularly clears in summer and was later used by Roald Amundsen in his successful navigation of the Northwest Passage. The Franklin expedition, locked in ice for two winters in Victoria Strait, was naval in nature and therefore not well equipped or trained for land travel. Some of the crew members heading south from Erebus and Terror hauled many items not needed for Arctic survival. McClintock noted a large quantity of heavy goods in the lifeboat at the "boat place" and thought them "a mere accumulation of dead weight, of little use, and very likely to break down the strength of the sledge-crews".

Other findings
In 2017, Douglas Stenton, an adjunct professor of anthropology at the University of Waterloo and former director of Nunavut's Department of Heritage and Culture, suggested that four sets of European human remains found on King William Island could possibly be women. He initially suspected that DNA testing would not offer up anything more, but to his surprise they registered that there was no 'Y' chromosomal element to the DNA. Stenton acknowledged that women were known to have served in the Royal Navy in the 17th, 18th and early 19th centuries, but he also pointed out that it could be that the DNA had simply degraded as further tests proved ambiguous and he concluded the initial findings were "almost certainly incorrect".

In 1993, three bodies were found at site NgLj-3 near Erebus Bay. The remains had originally been found by McClintock's expedition in 1859, and were rediscovered and buried by Schwatka two decades later. In 2013, a team led by Stenton had the remains exhumed for DNA testing and forensic facial reconstruction. The team's report, published in Polar Journal in 2015, indicated that the reconstructions of the two intact skulls from the remains resembled Lieutenant Gore and Ice-Master Reid of the Erebus; however, it was determined the remains could not have belonged to Gore, as the Victory Point note stated that Gore had died before the abandonment of the ships in April 1848.

In May 2021, one of the bodies was positively identified as that of Warrant Officer John Gregory, Erebus engineer. A genealogy team tracked down Gregory's great-great-great-grandson, Jonathan Gregory, residing in Port Elizabeth, South Africa, and confirmed the familial match through DNA testing.

Timeline
 1845, 19 May: Franklin expedition sails from England
 1845, July: Expedition docks in Greenland, sends home five men and a batch of letters
 1845, 28 July: Last sighting of expedition by Europeans (a whaling ship in Baffin Bay)
 1845–46: Expedition winters on Beechey Island. Three crewmen die of tuberculosis and are buried.
 1846:  and  leave Beechey Island and sail down Peel Sound towards King William Island
 1846, 12 September: Ships trapped in the ice off King William Island
 1846–47: Expedition winters on King William Island
 1847, 28 May: Sledge party led by Lt. Graham Gore and Mate Charles Des Voeux leaves identical notes at Victory Point and Gore Point, both concluding "All well"
 1847, 11 June: Franklin dies
 1847–48: Expedition again winters off King William Island, after the ice fails to thaw in 1847
 1848, 22 April: Erebus and Terror abandoned after one year and seven months trapped in the ice
 1848, 25 April: Date of second note, saying 24 men have died and the survivors plan to start marching south on 26 April to the Back River
 1850 (?): Inuit board an abandoned ship, which is icebound off King William Island
 1850 (?): Inuit see 40 men walking south on King William Island
 1851 (?): Inuit hunters see four men still trying to head south, last verified sighting of survivors (as reported to Charles Hall)
 1852–58 (?): Inuit may have seen Francis Crozier and one other survivor (presumably assistant surgeon Alexander McDonald) much further south in the Baker Lake area
 1854: John Rae interviews local Inuit, who give him items from the expedition and tell him the men starved to death, after resorting to cannibalism
 1859: McClintock finds the abandoned boat and the messages on an admiralty form in a cairn on King William Island
 1860–69: Hall leads two expeditions in search of Franklin records; in 1869, finds remains tentatively identified as Lieutenant HTD Le Vesconte, HMS Erebus; remains returned to England
 1878–80: Frederick Schwatka leads expedition in search of Franklin records; finds remains identified as Lieutenant John Irving, HMS Terror; remains returned to Scotland
 1981–82: Owen Beattie leads forensic teams retracing steps taken by McClintock and Schwatka expeditions
 1984–86: Beechey Island graves opened by Beattie's team, bodies examined
 2009: Remains found by Hall in 1869 reexamined, casting doubt on the Le Vesconte identification; a more likely candidate is assistant surgeon Harry Goodsir, HMS Erebus 2014: Wreck of Erebus found in Wilmot and Crampton Bay
 2016: Wreck of Terror found in Terror Bay
 2020: Archaeological efforts paused due to COVID-19 pandemic
 2021: Remains found by McClintock in 1859 identified as engineer John Gregory, HMS Erebus 2022: Research at wreck sites resumed in May, after two years of delays due to the pandemic.

Legacy

Historical
The most meaningful outcome of the Franklin expedition was the mapping of several thousand miles of hitherto unsurveyed coastline by expeditions searching for Franklin's lost ships and crew. As Richard Cyriax noted, "the loss of the expedition probably added much more [geographical] knowledge than its successful return would have done". At the same time, it largely quelled the Admiralty's appetite for Arctic exploration. There was a gap of many years before the Nares expedition and Sir George Nares' declaration there was "no thoroughfare" to the North Pole; his words marked the end of the Royal Navy's historical involvement in Arctic exploration, the end of an era in which such exploits were widely seen by the British public as worthy expenditures of human effort and monetary resources. Given how difficult and risky it was for professional explorers to cross the Northwest Passage, it would be impossible for the average merchant ships of the day to use this route for trade.

As a writer for The Athenaeum put it, "We think that we can fairly make out the account between the cost and results of these Arctic Expeditions, and ask whether it is worth while to risk so much for that which is so difficult of attainment, and when attained, is so worthless." The navigation of the Northwest Passage in 1903–05 by Roald Amundsen with the Gjøa expedition ended the centuries-long quest for the route.

 The Northwest Passage discovered 

Franklin’s expedition explored the vicinity of what was ultimately one of many Northwest Passages to be discovered. While he did not find much evidence of Franklin’s fate, he did finally ascertain an ice-bound route that connected the Atlantic Ocean to the Pacific Ocean. This was the Prince of Wales Strait, which was far to the north of Franklin’s ships.

On 21 October 1850, the following entry was recorded in ’s log:

"October 31st, the Captain returned at 8.30. A.M., and at 11.30. A.M., the remainder of the parting, having, upon the 26th instant, ascertained that the waters we are now in communicate with those of Barrow Strait, the north-eastern limit being in latitude 73°31′, N. longitude 114°39′, W. thus establishing the existence of a NORTH-WEST PASSAGE between the Atlantic and Pacific Oceans."

McClure was knighted for his discovery. While the McClure expedition obviously fared much better than Franklin's voyage, it was similarly beset by immense challenges (including the loss of the Investigator and four winters on the ice) and a number of controversies, including allegations of selfishness and poor planning on McClure’s part.

In 1855, a British parliamentary committee concluded that Robert McClure "deserved to be rewarded as the discoverer of a Northwest Passage". Today, the question of "who discovered the Northwest Passage?" is a subject of controversy, as all the different Passages have varying degrees of navigability. Although he did confirm the first geographical Northwest Passage that is navigable by ship under ideal conditions, McClure is rarely credited in modern times due to his troubled expedition, his poor personal reputation, the fact that his expedition was after Franklin’s (who has a claim to be the first discoverer, see below), and the fact that he never traversed the strait that he found, instead choosing to portage over Banks Island.

 Simpson Strait 
Members of the Franklin expedition crossed the southern shore of King William Island and made it onto the Canadian mainland; this is evident by the fact that human remains from the expedition have been found inland on the Adelaide Peninsula. This may have involved walking across the Simpson Strait which is now known as a way through from the Atlantic to the Pacific. It is possible that the Franklin expedition did discover that this is a Passage. As none of the members of the party made it out alive, it is not known whether any member of the party had realized this. George Back had discovered the strait in 1834 but did not realize it was a Northwest Passage. In any case, by 1854, it was widely believed that the remnants of the party had crossed the strait, and Lady Franklin was informed of such on 12 January by the Admiralty.

Franklin’s claim to having discovered the Passage is strengthened by Charles Richard Weld’s assertion that Franklin had long suspected that the Simpson Strait did connect the two oceans.

In 1860, Francis McClintock ascertained that the Simpson Strait was indeed a Northwest Passage. Following this discovery, to honour John Franklin’s legacy, the Royal Geographical Society declared that his lost expedition was the first expedition to discover the Passage. Lady Franklin was given a medal in his name.

The Northwest Passage would not be fully navigated by boat until 1906, when Roald Amundsen famously traversed the passage on the Gjøa, via the Simpson Strait.

Cultural depictions
Commemoration

For years after the loss of the Franklin Party, the Victorian media portrayed Franklin as a hero who led his men in the quest for the Northwest Passage. A statue of Franklin in his home town bears the inscription "Sir John Franklin – Discoverer of the North West Passage", and statues of Franklin outside the Athenaeum in London and in Tasmania bear similar inscriptions. Although the expedition's fate, including the possibility of cannibalism, was widely reported and debated, Franklin's standing with the Victorian public was undiminished. The expedition has been the subject of numerous works of non-fiction.

The mystery surrounding Franklin's last expedition was the subject of a 2006 episode of the NOVA television series Arctic Passage; a 2007 television documentary, "Franklin's Lost Expedition", on Discovery HD Theatre; as well as a 2008 Canadian documentary, Passage. In an episode of the 2009 ITV1 travel documentary series Billy Connolly: Journey to the Edge of the World, presenter Connolly and his crew visited Beechey Island, filmed the gravesite, and gave details of the Franklin expedition. NOVA revisited Franklin's expedition in the 2015 documentary Arctic Ghost Ship, which covered the Victoria Strait Expedition and its use of Inuit testimony as well as the latest technology to successfully locate the Erebus.

In memory of the lost expedition, one of Canada's Northwest Territories subdivisions was known as the District of Franklin. Including the high Arctic islands; this jurisdiction was abolished when the area was set off into the newly created Nunavut Territory on 1 April 1999.

On 29 October 2009, a special service of thanksgiving was held in the chapel at the Old Royal Naval College in Greenwich, to accompany the rededication of the national monument to Franklin there. The service also included the solemn re-interment of the only remains from the Erebus to be repatriated to England, entombed within the monument in 1873 (previously thought to be Second Lieutenant Henry Le Vesconte, but may actually have been Harry Goodsir, the assistant surgeon).Mays, S., et al., New light on the personal identification of a skeleton of a member of Sir John Franklin’s last
expedition to the Arctic, 1845, Journal of Archaeological Science (2011),  The following day, a group of polar authors went to London's Kensal Green Cemetery to pay their respects to the Arctic explorers buried there.

Many other veterans of the searches for Franklin are buried there too, including Admiral Sir Horatio Thomas Austin, Admiral Sir George Back, Admiral Sir Edward Augustus Inglefield, Admiral Bedford Pim, and Admiral Sir John Ross. Franklin's wife Jane Griffin, Lady Franklin, is also interred at Kensal Green in the vault, and commemorated on a marble cross dedicated to her niece Sophia Cracroft.

Literary works
From the 1850s through to the present day, Franklin's last expedition inspired numerous literary works. Among the first was a play, The Frozen Deep, written by Wilkie Collins with assistance and production by Charles Dickens. The play was performed for private audiences at Tavistock House early in 1857, as well as at the Royal Gallery of Illustration (including a command performance for Queen Victoria), and for the public at the Manchester Trade Union Hall. News of Franklin's death in 1859 inspired elegies, including one by Algernon Charles Swinburne.

Fictional treatments of the final Franklin expedition begin with Jules Verne's Journeys and Adventures of Captain Hatteras, (1866), in which the novel's hero seeks to retrace Franklin's footsteps and discovers that the North Pole is dominated by an enormous volcano. Verne also remembers the efforts of Jane Franklin to discover the fate of her husband in his novel Mistress Branican (1891) which stages a similar plot but situated in Oceania and Australia instead of the North Pole. Mark Twain briefly satirized the fate of the expedition and its subsequent searches in the beginning of the story "Some Learned Fables for Good Old Boys and Girls" (1875). The German novelist Sten Nadolny's The Discovery of Slowness (1983; English translation 1987) takes on the entirety of Franklin's life, touching only briefly on his last expedition.

Other recent novelistic treatments of Franklin include William T. Vollmann's The Rifles (1994), John Wilson's North With Franklin: The Journals of James Fitzjames (1999); and Dan Simmons's The Terror (2007), which was developed as a 2018 AMC television series also called The Terror. The expedition has also been the subject of a horror role-playing game supplement for Call of Cthulhu, The Walker in the Wastes. Most recently, Clive Cussler's 2008 novel Arctic Drift incorporates the ordeal of the Franklin expedition as a central element in the story, and Richard Flanagan's Wanting (2009) deals with Franklin's deeds in both Tasmania and the Arctic. On 12 January 2012, BBC Radio 4 broadcast Erebus, a radio play based on the Franklin expedition by British poet Jo Shapcott. Kassandra Alvarado's 2013 novel The White Passage presents a vaguely science-fiction take on an alternative history of the lost expedition.

Michael Palin's 2018 book, Erebus, The Story of a Ship, was described by The Guardian newspaper as 'lively and diligent.' He also produced a one man show based on his book.

A children's novel, Chasing Ghosts – An Arctic Adventure by Nicola Pierce featuring the expedition was published in 2020.

In 2017, The Breathing Hole, a play written by Colleen Murphy, premiered at the Stratford Festival, directed by Reneltta Arluk.  In this play, the fates of the crew of Erebus and Terror are featured within the context of an epic saga spanning five-hundred years.  Commissioned to mark Canada's 150th Anniversary and met with critical acclaim, the work involved artists from both Nunavut and the rest of Canada, including collaborations with Qaggiavuut Nunavut Performing Arts.  In 2020, the play was published in a dual-language edition in English and in Nattilingmiut syllabics—the Inuktitut dialect from where the story takes place in the Western Arctic.

Artistic works
In the visual arts, the loss of Franklin's expedition inspired a number of paintings in both the United States and Britain. In 1861, Frederic Edwin Church unveiled his great canvas The Icebergs; later that year, prior to taking it to England for exhibition, he added an image of a broken ship's mast in silent tribute to Franklin. In 1864, Sir Edwin Landseer's Man Proposes, God Disposes caused a stir at the annual Royal Academy exhibition; its depiction of two polar bears, one chewing on a tattered ship's ensign, the other gnawing on a human ribcage, was seen at the time as in poor taste, but has remained one of the most powerful imaginings of the expedition's final fate. The expedition also inspired numerous popular engravings and illustrations, along with many panoramas, dioramas, and magic lantern shows.

Musical works
Franklin's last expedition also inspired a great deal of music, beginning with the ballad "Lady Franklin's Lament" (also known as "Lord Franklin"), which originated in the 1850s and has been recorded by dozens of artists, among them Martin Carthy, Pentangle, Sinéad O'Connor, and The Pearlfishers. The Scottish pirate metal band Alestorm's song "Magnetic North" is dedicated to the expedition. Other Franklin-inspired songs include Fairport Convention's "I'm Already There", James Taylor's "Frozen Man" (based on Beattie's photographs of John Torrington) and Iron Maiden's "Stranger In A Strange Land". The ballad "Northwest Passage" by Stan Rogers also mentions Franklin.

Significance in Canada
The influence of the Franklin expedition on Canadian literature and culture has been especially significant. Among the best-known modern Franklin ballads is "Northwest Passage" by the late Ontario folksinger Stan Rogers (1981), which has been referred to as the unofficial Canadian national anthem. The distinguished Canadian novelist Margaret Atwood has also spoken of Franklin's expedition as a sort of national myth of Canada, remarking that "In every culture many stories are told, (but) only some are told and retold, and these stories bear examining ... in Canadian literature, one such story is the Franklin expedition." Notable treatments by Canadian poets include a verse play for radio, Terror and Erebus which was commissioned from Gwendolyn MacEwen, broadcast by CBC Radio (10 January 1965) and subsequently published in her collection Afterworlds (1987); and David Solway's verse cycle, Franklin's Passage (2003). The events have also featured prominently in Canadian novels, including Mordecai Richler's Solomon Gursky Was Here (1989) and Dominique Fortier's 2008 French language novel, Du bon usage des étoiles, which creatively considers the Franklin expedition from a variety of perspectives and genres and was both shortlisted and a finalist for several literary awards in Canada (2009 Governor General's Awards). Sheila Fischman's translation of Fortier's novel, On the Proper Use of Stars, was shortlisted for the 2010 Governor General's Awards for French to English Translation. Irish-Canadian writer Ed O'Loughlin's novel Minds of Winter was shortlisted for the 2017 Giller Prize.

See also
 List of people who disappeared mysteriously at sea

Notes
 The date given in the message is wrong, as Franklin wintered one year earlier at Beechey Island.

References

Works cited

 
 
 
 
 
 
 
 
 
 
 
 
 

Further reading

 
 
 
 
 
 
 
 
 
 
 
 
 
 
 
 
 
 
 
 

 External links 

 "Franklin's Last Voyage" at CanadianMysteries.ca''
 Video of Parks Canada dive on the wreck of HMS Terror
 
 

1840s missing person cases
1845 in Canada
1845 in the British Empire
19th century in the Arctic
Arctic expeditions
Expeditions from the United Kingdom
Exploration of the Arctic
Formerly missing people
 
Geography of Canada
History of Nunavut
History of the Northwest Territories
Incidents of cannibalism
Lead poisoning incidents
Maritime history of Canada
Mass disappearances
Missing person cases in Canada
American Geographical Society